Tosena paviei is a cicada species from Southeast Asia. It has been recorded from Thailand and Vietnam. The type specimens(s) were collected on the 'Route de Luang-Prabang à Theng'. Luang Prabang is now in Laos but Theng probably refers to Điện Biên Phủ, a city in the Northwest region of Vietnam near the border with Laos which was formerly called Thaeng or Muong Thanh (Mường Thanh). So it's not clear if the type specimen(s) were collected in Laos or Vietnam.

References

External links
Song of Tosena paviei

Insects described in 1896
Insects of Vietnam
Taxa named by Maurice Noualhier
Tosenini